Cucciolla is an Italian surname. Notable people with the surname include:

Arturo Cucciolla (1948–2021), Italian architect 
Riccardo Cucciolla (1924–1999), Italian actor

Italian-language surnames